The 2010 Varsity Cup was contested from 1 February to 29 March 2010. The tournament (also known as the FNB Varsity Cup presented by Steinhoff International for sponsorship reasons) was the third season of the Varsity Cup, an annual inter-university rugby union competition featuring eight South African universities.

Competition Rules
There were eight participating universities in the 2010 Varsity Cup. These teams played each other once over the course of the season, either home or away.

Teams received four points for a win and two points for a draw. Bonus points were awarded to teams that scored four or more tries in a game, as well as to teams that lost a match by seven points or less. Teams were ranked by log points, then points difference (points scored less points conceded).

The top four teams qualified for the Title Play-offs. In the semi-finals, the team that finished first had home advantage against the team that finished fourth, while the team that finished second had home advantage against the team that finished third. The winners of these semi-finals will play each other in the final, at the home venue of the higher-placed team.

Teams

The following teams took part in the 2010 Varsity Cup competition:

Table

Fixtures and results
 All times are South African (GMT+2)

Regular season

Week One

Week Two

Week Three

Week Four

Week Five

Week Six

Week Seven

Title Play-Off Games

Semi-finals

Final

Honours

See also
 Varsity Cup

References

External links
 Official Site
 

2010
2010 in South African rugby union
2010 rugby union tournaments for clubs
February 2010 sports events in Africa
March 2010 sports events in Africa